Philippine Division can refer to the Philippine Division (United States), or various divisions of the Philippine Army

 1st Infantry Division (Philippines)
 2nd Infantry Division (Philippines)
 3rd Infantry Division (Philippines)
 4th Infantry Division (Philippines)
 5th Infantry Division (Philippines)
 6th Infantry Division (Philippines)
 7th Infantry Division (Philippines)
 8th Infantry Division (Philippines)
 9th Infantry Division (Philippines)
 10th Infantry Division (Philippines)
 11th Infantry Division (Philippines)
 Armor "Pambato" Division